Zambia competed at the 1988 Summer Olympics in Seoul, South Korea.

Competitors
The following is the list of number of competitors in the Games.

Athletics

Men
Track & road events

Boxing

Men

Football

Men's

First round

Group B

Quarter-finals

Team Roster
 ( 1.) David Chabala
 ( 2.) Peter Mwanza
 ( 3.) Edmon Mumba
 ( 4.) Samuel Chomba
 ( 5.) James Chitalu
 ( 6.) Derby Makinka
 ( 7.) Johnson Bwalya
 ( 8.) Charles Musonda
 ( 9.) Beston Chambeshi
 (10.) Webster Chikabala
 (11.) Lucky Msiska
 (12.) Kalusha Bwalya
 (13.) Simon Mwansa
 (14.) Manfred Chabinga
 (15.) Ashols Melu
 (16.) Richard Mwanza
 (17.) Pearson Mwanza
 (18.) Wisdom Mumba Chansa
 (19.) Stone Nyirenda
 (20.) Eston Mulenga
Head Coach: Samuel Ndhlovu

References

Official Olympic Reports

Nations at the 1988 Summer Olympics
1988
Oly